James Logan (March 11, 1791 – December 6, 1859) was an early settler, politician and United States Indian agent in western Arkansas. Logan County was named for him in 1875.

Early life 
James Logan was born to David A. and Nancy Thurmond Logan near Stanford, Kentucky. His father David has no relationship to frontiersman Gen. Benjamin Logan, who came to Kentucky with Daniel Boone, and erected a fort at Stanford about the same time Boone erected the first fort. Logan married Rachel [presumed Steele] of Tennessee in Cape Girardeau, Missouri about 1815.

Career 
James Logan Lived in Wayne County, Missouri, with his wife until 1831 when he came to Arkansas with the many of the Logan family and their slaves settling on the Arkansas River west of Spadra. While there he established Logan's Post Office and was appointed a postmaster on February 11, 1832. When Logan arrived in Arkansas, he took over a large acreage of land and set his slaves to clearing and putting the land into cultivation. In 1839 an epidemic of Cholera hit his slaves so he decided to go south of the river. There he acquired 1,000 acres of land on Sugar Creek, near Booneville, which at that time was in Scott County. In 1834 Logan represented the county of Crawford in the Territorial Legislature of Arkansas, and was a Representative from Scott County to the Arkansas General Assembly in 1836. Afterwards he was Indian Agent and pay master for the Creek Indian Agency near Fort Gibson. He died November 11th, 1857, at his old home on Sugar Creek and his remains are in the family cemetery there

References

External links

1791 births
1859 deaths
People from Logan County, Arkansas
Politicians from Danville, Kentucky
United States Indian agents
Members of the Arkansas Territorial Legislature
Members of the Arkansas House of Representatives
19th-century American politicians